Thylacinus macknessi lived during the early Miocene and is the oldest known member of the genus Thylacinus. It is named after Brian Mackness, a supporter of Australian vertebrate paleontology.

T. macknessi was a quadrupedal marsupial predator, that in appearance looked similar to a dog with a long snout. Its molar teeth were specialized for carnivory; the cups and crest were reduced or elongated to give the molars a cutting blade.

When the species was first described, only the posterior section of the jaw was known. Two years later in 1995 at the same fossil site, Muirhead and Gillespie found the anterior half of the specimen in a block of limestone. Its fossils have been found in north-western Queensland at the Riversleigh world heritage area at Neville's Garden Site.

External links

natural worlds
Vernon Data
Australian Mammalia
ADDITIONAL PARTS OF THE TYPE SPECIMEN OF THYLACINUS MACKNESSl (MARSUPIALIA: THYLACINIDAE) FROM MIOCENE DEPOSITS OF RlVERSLEIGH, NORTHWESTERN QUEENSLAND JEANETfE MUIRHEAD AND ANNA K. GILLESPIE

Prehistoric thylacines
Prehistoric mammals of Australia
Oligocene marsupials
Chattian species first appearances
Riversleigh fauna
Miocene species extinctions
Fossil taxa described in 1992